Diploschizia lanista is a species of sedge moth in the genus Diploschizia. It was described by Edward Meyrick in 1918. It is found in North America, including Florida, Georgia, Oklahoma, South Carolina, North Carolina, Texas and Louisiana.

The length of the forewings is 2.7–4 mm. The forewings are grey fuscous in the basal two thirds, while the apical one third is dark fuscous. All markings have dark fuscous borders. The hindwings are fuscous. Adults have been recorded on wing from April to May and from July to September (in North Carolina), in April (in Louisiana) and in January, May, July, September, November and December (in Florida).

References

External links
 Diploschizia lanista at Zipcodezoo.com

Moths described in 1918
Glyphipterigidae